is a former Japanese football player.

Club statistics

References

External links

1980 births
Living people
Seisa Dohto University alumni
Association football people from Hokkaido
Sportspeople from Sapporo
Japanese footballers
J2 League players
Japan Football League players
Shonan Bellmare players
Tokushima Vortis players
Matsumoto Yamaga FC players
Fujieda MYFC players
Association football forwards